Edward Leroy Beard (December 9, 1939 – January 15, 2023) was an American professional football player.

Early life and education
Beard was born in Chesapeake, Virginia, on December 9, 1939. A 1959 graduate of Oscar F. Smith High School in South Norfolk, Virginia, Beard was an All-American and also State Heavyweight Wrestling Champion in 1957 when his high school, Oscar F. Smith, did not have a wrestling team;
the only time this has ever been accomplished by a wrestler. In 1960 Beard completed his post-graduate year at the Staunton Military Academy, where he was a standout football player. Beard played two years of college football at Tennessee before joining the Army, where he was selected Outstanding Player on the Army football team.

National Football League
Drafted by the San Francisco 49ers in 1964, Beard was a special teams captain and middle linebacker; during his eight years with the team, San Francisco won the NFC West three years in a row. Beard won the Len Eshmont award in 1971 and was the first special teams captain in NFL history. After his career was cut short by injuries, Beard served as linebackers coach for the 49ers and New Orleans Saints, and later became defensive coordinator for the Detroit Lions.

After the NFL
In 1996 the football field at Oscar Smith was renamed Beard-DeLong-Easley Field in honor of Beard and fellow alumni Steve DeLong and Kenny Easley. In 2002 Beard was inducted into the Virginia Sports Hall of Fame. He was honored along with other former 49ers on November 5, 2006, at an Alumni Day. After leaving football, Beard entered the contracting business and helped promote country music in the greater Hampton Roads area. On October 23, 2011, Beard was riding his bicycle in the north section of Chesapeake, Virginia, and saw a person being beaten by about 15-20 teenagers. He stopped to help the victim but was attacked by the group of youths and suffered a concussion, cuts, and bruises. Beard stated he would continue working with youth groups, something he had done for several years. As of March 2013, four of those involved had been sentenced to jail time. Beard stated he hoped this would help them turn their lives around.

Beard died on January 15, 2023, at the age of 83.

References

External links
Ed Beard's career stats
Ed Beard at the VSHOF

1939 births
2023 deaths
Sportspeople from Chesapeake, Virginia
Military  personnel from Virginia
Staunton Military Academy alumni
American football linebackers
San Francisco 49ers players
Tennessee Volunteers football players
Army Black Knights football players
National Football League defensive coordinators
New Orleans Saints coaches
Players of American football from Virginia
San Francisco 49ers coaches
Detroit Lions coaches